Pritchard's Bridge station was constructed by the Ulster Railway between Moira and Lurgan on 01/10/1842; closure is presumed in 1844?  The site of the station is on the mainline of the Belfast-Newry Line and Dublin Connolly Line.

References

Disused railway stations in County Armagh
Railway stations in the Republic of Ireland opened in 1842
Railway stations in Ireland closed in 1844
Railway stations in Northern Ireland opened in the 19th century